The mud elimia, scientific name Elimia alabamensis, is a species of freshwater snail with a gill and an operculum, a  gastropod mollusk in the family Pleuroceridae. This species is endemic to the United States.

References 

Pleuroceridae
Gastropods described in 1861
Taxonomy articles created by Polbot
Taxa named by Isaac Lea
Taxobox binomials not recognized by IUCN